Harel Levy and Jim Thomas were the defenders of championship title.
Yuri Schukin and Dmitri Sitak defeated 6–4, 7–6(4) Daniele Bracciali and Giancarlo Petrazzuolo in the final.

Seeds

Last matches

Semifinals and final

References
 Doubles Draw

Sanremo Tennis Cup - Doubles
Sanremo Tennis Cup